The Cape May County Special Services School District (CMCSSSD) is a special education public school district headquartered in Middle Township, in Cape May County, New Jersey, United States, whose schools offer educational and therapeutic services for students of elementary and high school age from across the county who have emotional of physical disabilities that cannot be addressed by their sending districts.

As of the 2011–12 school year, the district's two schools had an enrollment of 267 students and 45.3 classroom teachers (on an FTE basis), for a student–teacher ratio of 5.89:1.

Its facility has a Cape May Court House postal address but is not within the CMCH census-designated place.

History
It was established in 1974.

Schools
Schools in the district (with 2011-12 enrollment data from the National Center for Education Statistics) are:
Ocean Academy (98 students; in grades 1–8)
Cape May County High School (169; 9–12)
Annamarie Haas, Principal

Previously middle school grades were organized as George E. Bailey Middle School, and the high school was Alternative High School.

Administration
Core members of the district's administration are:
Barbara Makoski, Superintendent
Kathleen Allen, Business Administrator / Board Secretary

References

External links

Middle Township, New Jersey
School districts in Cape May County, New Jersey
Special schools in the United States
1974 establishments in New Jersey
School districts established in 1974